European route E 933 is a European B class road in Italy, connecting the city Alcamo – Trapani.

Route 
 
 E90 Alcamo
 E45 Trapani

External links 
 UN Economic Commission for Europe: Overall Map of E-road Network (2007)
 International E-road network

International E-road network
Roads in Italy